Ron Kostyshyn is a Canadian politician, who was elected to the Legislative Assembly of Manitoba in the 2011 election. He represented the electoral district of Swan River as a member of the Manitoba New Democratic Party caucus. Kostyshyn was appointed Minister of Agriculture, Food and Rural Initiatives on January 13, 2012 under Premier Greg Selinger.  He contested the 2016 election for the riding but was defeated by his Progressive Conservative opponent.

Born and raised in rural Manitoba, Kostyshyn graduated from Ethelbert High School in 1974, where his children also attended. For the past 26 years, Kostyshyn has worked on the family farm consisting of a 200 cow/calf operation with 2560 acres. He has served as Reeve of the RM of Mossey River and on council for two decades. He has also served on various boards including the Association of Manitoba Municipalities, Manitoba Conservation Commission, Intermountain Conservation District, Ethelbert District Veterinary Board, Farm Stewardship Association of Manitoba, and the Ethelbert Curling Club and Skating Rink.

Kostyshyn lives in the Ethelbert area and is married to his wife Judy.  They have two adult daughters and one grandson.

Electoral results

References

Living people
Members of the Executive Council of Manitoba
New Democratic Party of Manitoba MLAs
21st-century Canadian politicians
Year of birth missing (living people)